Paraplatypeza is a genus of flat-footed flies in the family Platypezidae.

Species
P. angustifrons Shatalkin, 1985
P. atra (Meigen, 1804)
P. bicincta (Szilády, 1941)
P. celaena Bowden, 1973
P. chandleri (Vanhara, 1981)
P. congoensis Kessel & Clopton, 1970
P. coraxa (Kessel, 1950)
P. ikekeba Kessel & Clopton, 1970
P. nudifrons Shatalkin, 1985
P. rara Shatalkin, 1982
P. triangulata Shatalkin, 1982
P. velutina (Loew, 1866)
P. zaitzevi Shatalkin, 1985

References

Platypezidae
Platypezoidea genera